Colin Valley Football Club is an Irish Intermediate Level Football club based in Poleglass, Belfast, currently playing in Division 1B of the Northern Amateur Football League.

Colin Valley FC were crowned Champions of Division 1C in 2014 earning promotion to 1B where they have played for the last 4 seasons.

Their reserve Team play in Division 3b after gaining promotion in 2017 and they have a third team playing in Division 1 of the Down Area Winter League.

There are also now junior Teams at age levels u19, u17, u15, u13, u12, u11, u10 as well as having 3 Development teams for ages below this.

The club was founded in 1995 and plays at Colin Valley Park. Club colours are now Sky Blue for the senior section - and Purple for the Junior Section.

The club participates in the Irish Cup.

External links
 Club web site
 nifootball.co.uk - (For fixtures, results and tables of all Northern Ireland amateur football leagues)

References

 

Association football clubs in Northern Ireland
Association football clubs in Belfast
Northern Amateur Football League clubs
1995 establishments in Northern Ireland
Association football clubs established in 1995